Betty Davies may refer to:

 Betty Ann Davies (1910–1955), British stage and film actress
 Betty Davies (radio) (1917–2018), British radio drama producer and director

See also
 Betty Davis (disambiguation)
 Bette Davis (1908–1989), American actress